Aphomia burellus is a species of snout moth in the genus Aphomia. It was described by William Jacob Holland in 1900 and is known from Buru in Indonesia.

References

Moths described in 1900
Tirathabini
Moths of Indonesia